St. James Theatre is a Broadway theatre in New York City.

St. James Theatre may also refer to:

Australia
St. James Theatre, Sydney, multi-storey building in Elizabeth Street, not to be confused with diminutive St James' Hall, Sydney

New Zealand
St. James Theatre, Auckland
St. James Theatre, Dunedin (now the Rialto Cinema)
St. James Theatre, Wellington

United Kingdom
St James's Theatre, London, demolished in 1957
St. James Theatre, London, opened in 2012

United States
St. James Theatre, Boston, Massachusetts
Fifth Avenue Theatre, New York City, New York (formerly the St. James Theatre; now demolished)